Kule is a village in Ghanzi District of Botswana. It is located close to the border with Namibia and has a primary school, clinic, customary court, social and development offices, animal health and production and police offices. The population was 741 in 2001 census.

References

Ghanzi District
Villages in Botswana